Pepper Road station is a Baltimore Light Rail station located in an industrial park in Hunt Valley, Maryland. The station opened in 1997 as part of the system's northern extension. It has a single side platform serving a single track.

References

External links

MTA Maryland - Light Rail stations
Station on Google Maps Street View

Baltimore Light Rail stations
Hunt Valley, Maryland
Railway stations in Baltimore County, Maryland
1997 establishments in Maryland
Railway stations in the United States opened in 1997